Shadow Chasers is an American science fiction mystery television series created by Brian Grazer and Kenneth Johnson. Fourteen episodes were produced, ten of which were shown on the ABC television network, the remaining four on the Armed Forces Network. It debuted on November 14, 1985, and was produced by Warner Bros. Television.

Plot
Shadow Chasers features strait-laced British anthropologist Jonathan MacKensie (played by Trevor Eve), who works for the fictional Georgetown Institute Paranormal Research Unit (PRU). MacKenzie's department head, Dr. Julianna Moorhouse (Nina Foch), withholds a research grant to force him into investigating a supposed "haunting" involving a teenage boy (Bobby Fite). He is paired with flamboyant tabloid reporter Edgar "Benny" Benedek (Dennis Dugan) to reduce the length of the investigation, over Moorhouse's objections. Benny and Jonathan did not get along, but managed to solve the case despite their differences. The episodes featured Jonathan and Benny grudgingly learning to respect and admire each other.

Cast
 Dennis Dugan as Edgar 'Benny' Benedek
 Trevor Eve as Dr. Jonathan MacKensie
 Nina Foch as Dr. Juliana Moorhouse
 Hermione Baddeley as Melody Lacey
 Avery Schreiber as Jordan Kerner
 Teresa Ganzel as Christy

Episodes

Reception
Only nine episodes were shown in the U.S. Four others were only shown overseas on the Armed Forces Network during the original run of the series. The pilot frequently appears on cable, particularly on the Mystery Channel.

The show was the lowest-rated of 106 programs during the 1985-1986 TV season, (due in part to being broadcast in the same time slot as NBC's The Cosby Show and Family Ties and CBS's Magnum P.I. and later, Simon & Simon) averaging only a 5.8/9 rating/share. This competition had been the focus of a series of humorous commercials for the series, starring luminaries of the time as Ricardo Montalbán and Ron Howard.  While heavily promoted during the network's mini-series North and South, the commercials proved to be prophetic, in that the series drew small audiences, and was frequently pre-empted in some markets.

References

External links

Shadow Chasers Home Page

American Broadcasting Company original programming
1985 American television series debuts
1986 American television series endings
1980s American science fiction television series
English-language television shows
Occult detective fiction
Television shows set in Washington, D.C.
Television series by Warner Bros. Television Studios